Evanoff Provincial Park is a provincial park in British Columbia, Canada.

Geography
The park is situated in the Hart Ranges of the Canadian Rockies. This park protects one of the most remarkable caves, the nationally significant Fang Cave complex, which includes the ninth longest cave in Canada. Other caves include the Tooth Decave and Window on the West.

The park also provides a scenic, easily accessible destination for backcountry recreation. It includes picturesque alpine bowls, three small alpine lakes, and distinctive limestone pinnacles and ridges. Two separate trails, the Fang Trail and Torpy Trail provide access to small alpine basins, with a connection over Fang Mountain. The Torpy Trail continues outside the park to Torpy Mountain.

See also
Close To The Edge Provincial Park and Protected Area

References

Regional District of Fraser-Fort George
Provincial parks of British Columbia
Year of establishment missing